Ostrytsia is a village in Hertsa Raion, Chernivtsi Oblast, Ukraine. It hosts the administration of Ostrytsia rural hromada, one of the hromadas of Ukraine,

Until 18 July 2020, Ostrytsia belonged to Hertsa Raion. The raion was abolished in July 2020 as part of the administrative reform of Ukraine, which reduced the number of raions of Chernivtsi Oblast to three. The area of Hertsa Raion was merged into Chernivtsi Raion.

References

Villages in Chernivtsi Raion
Populated places on the Prut